Aleksandar Kitinov and Johan Landsberg were the defending champions but they competed with different partners that year, Kitinov with Lovro Zovko and Landsberg with Karsten Braasch.

Kitinov and Zovko lost in the first round to Galo Blanco and Juan Antonio Marín.

Braasch and Landsberg lost in the quarterfinals to Juan Ignacio Carrasco and Álex López Morón.

Jens Knippschild and Peter Nyborg won in the final 6–3, 6–3 against Emilio Benfele Álvarez and Andrés Schneiter.

Seeds

  Karsten Braasch /  Johan Landsberg (quarterfinals)
  Massimo Bertolini /  Cristian Brandi (quarterfinals)
  Aleksandar Kitinov /  Lovro Zovko (first round)
  Emilio Benfele Álvarez /  Andrés Schneiter (final)

Draw

External links
 2002 Open Romania Doubles Draw

2002,Doubles
2002 ATP Tour
2002 in Romanian tennis